"Dov'è l'amore" is a song recorded by American singer Cher for her twenty-second studio album, Believe (1998). It was written by Mark Taylor and Paul Barry, and produced by Taylor and Brian Rawling, and released as the fourth single from the album on October 25, 1999, by Warner Bros. Records, and WEA. The song is a Latin-influenced track with Spanish guitar over dance beats. In the song, Cher mixes English with Italian lyrics as she sings: "Dov'è l'amore /dov'è l'amore /I cannot tell you of my love/ here is my story".

Critical reception
Rolf E. Lund from Norwegian newspaper Altaposten described "Dov'è l'amore" as a "sophisticated" song in his review. J.W. Lim from Associated Press said that it, with "The Power" and "We All Sleep Alone" are "bright spots" of the Believe album. The Daily Vault's Michael R. Smith wrote that "even Madonna was envious when she heard the Latin-infused track for the first time." Sarah Davis from Dotmusic described it as "catchy", noting that "skilful writing and slick production on vocal effects and vibrant beats gives the song its own appeal." Entertainment Weeklys Beth Johnson commented that Cher's "unmistakable voice makes the song shine". She described it as an "Italian salsa". Henrik Bæk of Gaffa noted that the song is the only track that deviates from the electronic dance music sound on the album. He described it as a "world music characterized" song that with the help of the Gipsy Kings "swings magnificently in Latin American rhythms." Deborah Wilker from Knight Ridder said that Cher "fetes" Madonna's "La Isla Bonita" "with the romantic "Dov'è l'amore"". Bob Waliszewski of Plugged In wrote that Cher "expresses affection across the miles" on the song.

Music video

In a 1999 Norwegian interview, when Cher said that "Dov'è l'amore" would serve as the fourth international single from the album, she also revealed that singer Madonna insisted that she wanted to direct its music video, but for unknown reasons, she was replaced by Jamie O'Connor.

The video for "Dov'è l'amore" follows the story of a man who tries to win the affections of a Latina woman. During the course of the video many people are shown dancing to flamenco, others are shown playing guitars and some people are just enjoying watching the dancers. In the video Cher wore a big red flamenco dress and she sat in a red room while singing and petting a chihuahua dog. The concept of the song and video was considered an attempt to ride into the wave of the rising Latin influence in music at the time of its release, having both a Spanish genre, and Italian lyrics.

The track used for the original "Dov'è l'amore" video was the Emilio Estefan, Jr. Radio Edit mix instead of the album version which is slightly slower and lasts nearly 30 seconds longer.

In late 1999, Dan-O-Rama remixed the "Dov'è l'amore" video, but instead of using a remix of the song he left the "Dov'è l'amore" (Emilio Estefan Jr. Radio Edit) in it and only remixed some video clips. In the year 2000, this video was released as a promo on VHS tape in the UK. In 2004, it was officially released on DVD in the video compilation, The Very Best of Cher: The Video Hits Collection.

Track listings

"Dov'è l'amore"

UK CD1
 "Dov'è l'amore" (radio edit) – 3:44
 "Dov'è l'amore" (Ray Roc's Latin soul vocal mix) – 9:37
 "Dov'è l'amore" (Tony Moran's Anthem 7-inch mix) – 3:30

UK CD2 and Australian CD single
 "Dov'è l'amore" – 4:18
 "Dov'è l'amore" (Tony Moran's Anthem mix) – 9:54
 "Dov'è l'amore" (Tee's radio) – 3:20

UK cassette single
 "Dov'è l'amore" (radio edit) – 3:44
 "Dov'è l'amore" (Ray Roc's Latin soul vocal mix) – 9:37

UK 12-inch single
A1. "Dov'è l'amore" (Emilio Estefan Jnr. extended mix) – 5:38
A2. "Dov'è l'amore" (Ray Roc's Latin soul vocal mix) – 9:37
B1. "Dov'è l'amore" (Tony Moran's Anthem mix) – 9:54
B2. "Dov'è l'amore" (Tee's radio) – 3:20

European CD single
 "Dov'è l'amore" – 4:18
 "Dov'è l'amore" (radio edit) – 3:44

"All or Nothing" / "Dov'è l'amore"

US maxi-CD single
 "All or Nothing" (Danny Tenaglia international mix)
 "All or Nothing" (Metro radio mix)
 "All or Nothing" (Danny Tenaglia Cherbot Vocadub)
 "All or Nothing" (Almighty Definitive mix)
 "Dov'è l'amore" (Todd Terry's TNT club mix)
 "Dov'è l'amore" (Tony Moran's Anthem mix)
 "Dov'è l'amore" (Ray Roc's Latin soul vocal mix)
 "Dov'è l'amore" (Tee's radio mix)
 "Dov'è l'amore" (Tony Moran's Anthem 7-inch mix)
 "Dov'è l'amore" (Ray Roc's radio mix)

US 2×12-inch single
A1. "All or Nothing" (Danny Tenaglia international mix) – 9:46
A2. "All or Nothing" (Almighty Definitive mix) – 8:32
B1. "All or Nothing" (Danny Tenaglia Cherbot Vocadub) – 12:37
B2. "All or Nothing" (Metro radio mix) – 3:59
C1. "Dov'è l'amore" (Todd Terry's TNT club mix) – 6:56
C2. "Dov'è l'amore" (Tony Moran's Anthem mix) – 9:54
D1. "Dov'è l'amore" (Ray Roc's Latin soul vocal mix) – 9:37
D2. "Dov'è l'amore" (Todd Terry's MT's club mix) – 6:52

Charts

Weekly charts

Year-end charts

References

External links
 Official Cher site
 Warner official site
 

1998 songs
1999 singles
Cher songs
Latin pop songs
Macaronic songs
Song recordings produced by Mark Taylor (record producer)
Songs written by Mark Taylor (record producer)
Songs written by Paul Barry (songwriter)
Warner Records singles